
Year 424 BC was a year of the pre-Julian Roman calendar. At the time, it was known as the Year of the Tribunate of Crassus, Fidenas, Rutilus and Iullus (or, less frequently, year 330 Ab urbe condita). The denomination 424 BC for this year has been used since the early medieval period when the Anno Domini calendar era became the prevalent method in Europe for naming years.

Events 
 By place 

 Persian empire 
 Xerxes II rules as King of Persia for only about 45 days until he is killed. He is reportedly murdered, while drunk, by Pharnacyas and Menostanes on the orders of Secydianus (or Sogdianus), the son of one of Artaxerxes I's concubines, Alogyne of Babylon.

 Greece 
 At the Congress of Gela, the statesman Hermocrates of Syracuse persuades the cities of Sicily to agree to make peace and urges the exclusion of foreign powers. As a result, the three-year war between his city and Sicily's pro-Athenian town ends and the Athenian forces, which had been sent to Sicily to support Greek settlements, are forced to withdraw.
 Demosthenes and Hippocrates attempt to capture Megara, but they are defeated by the Spartans under their general Brasidas. Demosthenes then marches to Naupactus to assist in a democratic revolution, and to gather troops for an invasion of Boeotia. However, Demosthenes and Hippocrates are unable to coordinate their attacks and Hippocrates is defeated at the Battle of Delium by Pagondas of Thebes. During the battle, Socrates is said to have saved the life of Alcibiades. Demosthenes attacks Sicyon and is defeated as well.
 After he frustrates the Athenian attack on Megara, Brasidas marches through Boeotia and Thessaly to Chalcidice at the head of 700 helots and 1000 Peloponnesian mercenaries to join the Macedonian king Perdiccas II. Refusing to be made a tool for the furtherance of Perdiccas' ambitions, Brasidas wins over the important cities of Acanthus, Stagirus, Amphipolis, and Torone as well as several minor towns. An attack on Eion is foiled by the arrival of Thucydides at the head of an Athenian squadron.
 Brasidas' capture of the city of Amphipolis is a major reverse for Athens, for which the Athenian general (and future historian) Thucydides is held responsible and banished. This gives Thucydides the opportunity for undistracted study for his History and travel and wider contacts, especially on the Peloponnesian side (Sparta and its allies).
 Nicias captures the Peloponnesian island of Cythera, from which to harry the Spartans.

 By topic 

 Architecture 
 The temple to Athena Nike (also known as the Wingless Victory) on the Athenian Acropolis is completed. It has been designed by the Athenian architect Callicrates.

Literature 
Aristophanes' play "Knights" was first produced in the late winter of 424 B.C. at the Lenaean Dionysia and took first prize, defeating Cratinus, who came in second with Satyrs.( From: Roche, Paul. “Aristophanes: The Complete Plays.” The New American Library)

Births 

424/423 BC - estimated birth of Plato, a famous philosopher.

Deaths 
 Xerxes II, King of Persia.

References